Magnatone was a brand of electric guitars and amplifiers produced between 1937 and the mid-1970s. The company was based in California. The brand name was revived in the 2010s by Ted Kornblum.

History
Beginning in the late 1930s, Magna Electronics produced amplifiers, Hawaiian and steel guitars. In the 1950s and 1960s, they produced vibrato-equipped amplifiers which were used by musicians including Buddy Holly and Lonnie Mack. The 'real' vibrato effect called F.M. Vibrato was distinct in sound and design from the more common tremolo circuits found on Fender amplifiers.

Magnatone amplifiers began in the late 1930s as the Dickerson Musical Instrument Company founded by Delbert J. Dickerson in southern California. They made steel guitars and amplifiers designed for that instrument.

In the forties Gaston Fator Guitar Studios in Los Angeles bought the business from Dickerson. Fator owned it for a few years, and then sold it to Art Duhamell around 1946. During the years Fator ran the business, there was little engineering or innovation, he basically continued the product lines Dickerson had established and continued to build amps and guitars for other manufacturers as well.

In the hands of its new owner, Art Duhamell, the amplifier and guitar brand name was changed to Magnatone, and the company name was Magna Electronics Company. Duhamell built Magnatones alongside record players, radios, and speakers. By 1950, Magna expanded from their Jefferson Boulevard, Los Angeles location with three new buildings at 9749 S. Freeman Ave. and employed more than twenty-five employees.

Paul Bigsby designed solid-body guitars for Magnatone from 1955–1957.

Pioneering blues-rock guitar soloist Lonnie Mack used Magnatone vibrato amps almost exclusively. A Magnatone amp was also the basis of the signature guitar sound of Robert Ward. They are still used today by musicians including Neil Young, who uses a 280 Stereo in his live rig.

Revival
The brand was revived in early 2013 with a line of boutique amps, some of which are reproductions of previous Magnatone designs. The brand name was revived by Ted Kornblum (formerly of Ampeg and St. Louis Music), and input on the amps' respective designs was provided by Billy Gibbons and Neil Young's guitar tech, Larry Cragg. The new line of six different Magnatone models debuted at the 2013 NAMM Show in Anaheim, California.

References

External links

 
  — an overview of Magnatone amplifiers

Guitar manufacturing companies of the United States
Audio equipment manufacturers of the United States
Guitar amplifier manufacturers